Atikonak Lake is a lake in southern Labrador near the border with Quebec, Canada.

The flora is population of endemic genus Atikonakia of Volvocaceae.

See also
List of lakes of Newfoundland and Labrador

References 

Labrador
Lakes of Newfoundland and Labrador